Charles Campbell Ross (born London 1849; died 9 July 1920, Whitechapel) was a British politician and banker based in Penzance, Cornwall. The grandson of the banker Joseph Carne through his eldest daughter Mary (who married, 9 August 1836, Dr Archibald Campbell Colquhoun Ross, of Lanarkshire), he was educated at Brighton College, he was leading member of the Penzance Borough Council in the 1880s serving as mayor five times in 1877, 1878, 1879, 1881 and 1883. During this period he was also member of parliament for the St Ives constituency (1881–1885) as a member of the Conservative Party. The General Election of 1885 was "fiercely contested" and he was defeated by the Liberal candidate, Sir John St Aubyn.

His family home and estate in Penzance are now the Morrab Library and Morrab Gardens. He also held the positions of borough magistrate, county magistrate and Hon Secretary of the West Cornwall Infirmary. The Ross bridge in Penzance is named after Charles Ross.

Charles Ross was a major partner in the Penzance Bank (otherwise known as Batten, Carne and Carne) which had major branches in Penzance and Devonport. He inherited the position from his grandfather the well known Cornish banker and geologist Joseph Carne FRS. In 1896 the Penzance bank ceased trading, and was wound up by 1897. Following the collapse of the bank Charles Ross moved to London and became a curator of a museum in the east of the city.

He married in 1870 his cousin Isabella Emily Carne (d 1888). Their son Archibald Campbell Carne Ross was the father of the linguist Alan S C Ross.

References

External links
 
 History of the Carne family

1849 births
1920 deaths
Conservative Party (UK) MPs for English constituencies
Mayors of places in Cornwall
Members of the Parliament of the United Kingdom for St Ives
People educated at Brighton College
People from Penzance
Politicians from Cornwall
UK MPs 1880–1885
English bankers